Ride is the first EP by British rock band Ride and their debut, released in January 1990. It was in the UK singles charts for four weeks and was the first Creation Records label release to enter U.K. Top 75. 

“Ride” EP was combined with its follow-up Play to form the Smile mini-album for the US market in July, 1990. Two years later, in November, 1992, Smile was released in the UK, too, after both EPs had gone out of print.

In November 2022, all four songs from “Ride” EP were made available on ‘‘4EPs’’, a compilation of Ride’s first four EPs made available together for the first time and packaged as one gatefold album on white vinyl and in CD format. It charted at number 78 on the UK Albums Chart.

Track listing

References

External links
Lyrics

Ride (band) albums
1990 debut EPs
Creation Records EPs
UK Independent Singles Chart number-one singles